William A. Heiss House and Buggy Shop is a historic home located at Mifflinburg, Union County, Pennsylvania.  The property includes three buildings; the house, buggy shop, and display-storage center.  The house was built in 1870, and is a two-story, five-bay frame dwelling with a rear ell.  The buggy shop was built in 1889, and is a two-story, rectangular wood-frame building, 63 feet long and 24 feet wide.  The display-storage center was built in 1895, and is a two-story, rectangular wood-frame building, 33 feet long and 50 feet wide.  It is representative of the buggy manufacturers who once had a notable presence in Mifflinburg.

It was listed on the National Register of Historic Places in 1979.

The property is the Mifflinburg Buggy Museum. Visitors can tour the Heiss family home, reconstructed carriage house, the original buggy factory with carriages, wagons, and sleighs and tools, and original showroom. There is a visitor center with an introductory video, self-guided exhibit and hands-on workbench.

References

External links
 Mifflinburg Buggy Museum

Industrial buildings and structures on the National Register of Historic Places in Pennsylvania
Houses on the National Register of Historic Places in Pennsylvania
Houses completed in 1870
Industrial buildings completed in 1889
Industrial buildings completed in 1895
Houses in Union County, Pennsylvania
National Register of Historic Places in Union County, Pennsylvania
Museums in Union County, Pennsylvania
Historic house museums in Pennsylvania
Carriage museums
Transportation museums in Pennsylvania
Historic House Museums of the Pennsylvania Germans